Sir Tīmoti Samuel Kāretu  (born 29 April 1937) is a New Zealand academic of Māori language and performing arts. He served as the inaugural head of the Department of Māori at the University of Waikato, and rose to the rank of professor. He was the first Māori language commissioner, between 1987 and 1999, and then was executive director of Te Kohanga Reo National Trust from 1993 until 2003. In 2003, he was closely involved in the foundation of Te Panekiretanga o te Reo, the Institute of Excellence in Māori Language, and served as its executive director.

Songwriting 
In 2019, Kāretu translated nine songs from English to Māori language for the album, Waiata / Anthems, which peaked at number 1 on the New Zealand album charts in September 2019. In 2021, Kāretu helped write the Six60 song "Pepeha", and translated "Hua Pirau / Fallen Fruit" New Zealand singer-songwriter Lorde for her Te Reo Māori extended play Te Ao Mārama.

Personal life and honours 
Kāretu was born in Hastings. He was adopted at the age of two months in a whāngai adoption by his great uncle Tame Kāretu and Mauwhare Taiwera. He was raised at Waikaremoana, Waimārama and Ruatāhuna, and affiliates to Ngāi Tūhoe and Ngāti Kahungunu.

In the 1993 New Year Honours, Kāretu was appointed a Companion of the Queen's Service Order for public services, and in the 2017 Queen's Birthday Honours he was named a Knight Companion of the New Zealand Order of Merit, for services to the Māori language. He has been conferred honorary doctorates by Victoria University of Wellington in 2003, and the University of Waikato in 2008. In 2020 he was honoured with the Prime Minister's Award for Literary Achievement in the non-fiction category and was elected a Companion of Royal Society Te Apārangi.

Kāretu won the 2021 Te Mūrau o te Tuhi Māori Language Award at the Ockham New Zealand Book Awards. He had been joint winner of the same award two years earlier.

References

1937 births
Living people
Ngāi Tūhoe people
Ngāti Kahungunu people
Academic staff of the University of Waikato
Companions of the Queen's Service Order
Knights Companion of the New Zealand Order of Merit
People from Hastings, New Zealand
Companions of the Royal Society of New Zealand
New Zealand adoptees